Zakpa Komenan (1945 – 19 May 2021) was an Ivorian politician who served as Minister of Education.

References

1945 births
2021 deaths
Education ministers of Ivory Coast
Sports ministers of Ivory Coast
Democratic Party of Côte d'Ivoire – African Democratic Rally politicians
People from Savanes District